Sol Zanetti (born 1982) is a Quebec politician, who was elected to the National Assembly of Quebec in the 2018 provincial election. He represents the electoral district of Jean-Lesage as a member of Québec solidaire.

He was previously the leader of Option nationale, a Quebec sovereigntist political party, from 2013 to 2018.

A candidate for the party in the 2012 provincial election, Zanetti won the party's leadership on October 26, 2013, winning 67 per cent of the leadership vote against musician and activist Nic Payne. He led the party into the 2014 provincial election.

In September 2014, Zanetti published a video on YouTube encouraging voters in the Scottish independence referendum to vote yes.

The party was dissolved in 2018, merging with Québec solidaire.

He is of Italian and Québécois descent.

Electoral record

References

External links
Sol Zanetti

1982 births
Living people
Canadian people of Italian descent
Université Laval alumni
Quebec political party leaders
People from Sainte-Foy, Quebec City
Politicians from Quebec City
Québec solidaire MNAs